William Boyd (born 18 October 1958) is a former footballer who played for Doncaster Rovers as a goalkeeper.

He won Schoolboy Honours and was a Scotland Youth International.

Senior club career

Hull City
Boyd signed for Hull City in October 1977, but didn't make it to play for the first team.

Doncaster Rovers
He was signed by English Division 4 club Doncaster Rovers in February 1980, enabling the club to sell the current keeper, Dennis Peacock, for some much needed funds. His debut was in a 3–2 defeat at Peterborough United on 22 March 1980. The following season Boyd played in all games bar one as Rovers gained promotion to Division 3.

After making a total of 118 League and Cup appearances, it was at the end of the 1982–83 season that Boyd retired from the professional game hampered by his knee injury, with Dennis Peacock having made a return to the club at the beginning of that season as the first choice keeper.

He went to play amateur football with Grantham Town, and became a HGV driver, remaining in the Doncaster area.

References

1958 births
Living people
Footballers from Bellshill
Scottish footballers
English Football League players
Association football goalkeepers
Scotland youth international footballers
Hull City A.F.C. players
Doncaster Rovers F.C. players
Grantham Town F.C. players